Jack is a 2004 American made-for-television drama film written by A. M. Homes and directed by Lee Rose. Adapted from Homes' 1990 novel of the same name, the film is about a boy whose life is torn apart because of his parents' divorce. The film stars Anton Yelchin, Stockard Channing, Ron Silver, Erich Anderson and Brent Spiner.

Plot
Jack is a 15-year-old boy going through puberty. When his parents Anne and Paul divorce, his world starts to fall apart. While on a fishing trip with his father, Jack learns that Paul is in a live-in relationship with a man. The youth is bullied at school when other students find out about this.

Jack's best friend Max also has problems, because his mother is being beaten by his father. Jack has a crush on another friend, Maggie, and learns that her father is also gay. By the end, Jack matures and learns to accept his family and friends, and more importantly, himself.

Cast

External links

2004 LGBT-related films
2000s teen drama films
2004 television films
2004 films
American coming-of-age drama films
American LGBT-related films
American teen drama films
2000s English-language films
Films based on American novels
LGBT-related drama films
Films about puberty
2004 drama films
American drama television films
Films directed by Lee Rose (director)
2000s coming-of-age drama films
2000s American films